"O me voy o te Vas" ("Either I'll Go Or You'll Go") is a song written and recorded by Marco Antonio Solís. The song's lyrics are a plea from Solís that the person to whom he is singing stop emphasizing that which he does wrong and focus on making their relationship run smoothly. Released in 2001 on the album Más de Mi Alma, the song performed very well in the United States on Spanish-language radio and eventually topped the Billboard Hot Latin Tracks chart. It also appeared on Billboard's Bubbling Under the Hot 100 chart, reaching a highest position of 16. The song was nominated for Pop Song of the Year at the 2002 Lo Nuestro Awards.

Chart performance

References 

2001 singles
Marco Antonio Solís songs
Songs written by Marco Antonio Solís
Fonovisa Records singles
2001 songs